The 1950 Cupa României was the 13th edition of Romania's most prestigious football cup competition.

The title was won by CCA București against Flamura Roşie Arad.

Format
The competition is an annual knockout tournament.

In the first round proper, two pots are made, the first pot with Divizia A teams and other teams till 16 and the second pot with the rest of teams qualified in this phase. First-pot teams will play away. Each tie is played as a single leg.

If a match is drawn after 90 minutes, the game goes in extra time, and if the score is still tied after 120 minutes, the team who plays away will qualify.

In case the teams are from same city, a replay will be played.

In case the teams play in the final, a replay will be played.

From the first edition, the teams from Divizia A entered in competition in sixteen finals, rule which remained till today.

First round proper

|colspan=3 style="background-color:#FFCCCC;"|2 July 1950

|}

Second round proper

|colspan=3 style="background-color:#FFCCCC;"|16 August 1950

|-
|colspan=3 style="background-color:#FFCCCC;"|17 August 1950

|-
|colspan=3 style="background-color:#FFCCCC;"|7 September 1950 — Replay

|}

Quarter-finals 

|colspan=3 style="background-color:#FFCCCC;"|10 September 1950

|-
|colspan=3 style="background-color:#FFCCCC;"|11 October 1950

|-
|colspan=3 style="background-color:#FFCCCC;"|12 October 1950

|}

Semi-finals

|colspan=3 style="background-color:#FFCCCC;"|25 October 1950

|-
|colspan=3 style="background-color:#FFCCCC;"|1 November 1950

|}

Final

References

External links
 romaniansoccer.ro
 Official site

Cupa României seasons
Cupa Romaniei
Romania